Charles Kimberlin Helton (born July 28, 1948) is an American college and professional football coach. He served as the head football coach of the University of Houston from 1993 to 1999, compiling a record of 24–53–1.

Early years
Helton was born in Pensacola, Florida. He attended Gainesville High School and the University of Florida in Gainesville, Florida, where he played center for coach Ray Graves' Florida Gators football team from 1967 to 1969.  He graduated from Florida with a bachelor's degree in physical education in 1970.

Coaching career
Helton began his coaching career as head coach at Eastside High School in Gainesville in 1970. After two seasons there, Helton became a graduate assistant at the University of Florida in 1972. Later, Helton became the offensive line coach under new Gators head coach Doug Dickey, a position he held from 1973 to 1978.  In 1979, he was hired by Howard Schnellenberger to serve as the offensive coordinator for the Miami Hurricanes.

In 1982 Helton moved to the National Football League (NFL), becoming offensive line coach under head coaches John McKay and Leeman Bennett with the Tampa Bay Buccaneers.  He later held similar positions with the Houston Oilers and Los Angeles Raiders.  In early 1993, Helton agreed to join the Miami Dolphins as offensive line coach, but was offered the head coaching position at the University of Houston before starting with the Dolphins.

In seven years at Houston, Helton had two winning seasons and one bowl game appearance. He was fired in November 1999, after a 7-4 season.  After a few years out of coaching, Helton was hired by fellow Florida alumnus Steve Spurrier to coach the Washington Redskins offensive line.  After Spurrier's dismissal as Redskins head coach in 2003, Helton became the running backs coach for the CFL's Toronto Argonauts.  In January 2007, he was hired as offensive coordinator at UAB by Neil Callaway who had served as offensive coordinator himself under Helton at Houston. Callaway and his staff were fired following the 2011 season.

After Helton's son, Tyson Helton, was named head football coach at Western Kentucky University, he joined the coaching staff as an offensive analyst in the spring of 2019.

Helton was inducted in the University of Florida Athletic Hall of Fame as a "Distinguished Letter Winner" in 2001.

Head coaching record

See also
 List of University of Florida alumni
 List of University of Florida Athletic Hall of Fame members

References

Bibliography
Carlson, Norm, University of Florida Football Vault: The History of the Florida Gators, Whitman Publishing, LLC, Atlanta, Georgia (2007).  .
Golenbock, Peter, Go Gators!  An Oral History of Florida's Pursuit of Gridiron Glory, Legends Publishing, LLC, St. Petersburg, Florida (2002).  .
Hairston, Jack, Tales from the Gator Swamp: A Collection of the Greatest Gator Stories Ever Told, Sports Publishing, LLC, Champaign, Illinois (2002).  .
McCarthy, Kevin M.,  Fightin' Gators: A History of University of Florida Football, Arcadia Publishing, Mount Pleasant, South Carolina (2000).  .
McEwen, Tom, The Gators: A Story of Florida Football, The Strode Publishers, Huntsville, Alabama (1974).  .
Nash, Noel, ed., The Gainesville Sun Presents The Greatest Moments in Florida Gators Football, Sports Publishing, Inc., Champaign, Illinois (1998).  .

External links
 Western Kentucky profile

1948 births
Living people
American football centers
Florida Gators football coaches
Florida Gators football players
Houston Cougars football coaches
Houston Oilers coaches
Los Angeles Raiders coaches
Miami Dolphins coaches
Miami Hurricanes football coaches
Tampa Bay Buccaneers coaches
Toronto Argonauts coaches
UAB Blazers football coaches
Washington Redskins coaches
High school football coaches in Florida
Coaches of American football from Florida
Players of American football from Pensacola, Florida